Hammer of the Witch is the sixth studio album by the American hardcore band Ringworm. The album was released in 2014 on Relapse Records, their first studio album for the label.

The album charted at No. 14 on the Billboard Heatseekers Albums chart and No. 21 on the Billboard Hard Rock Albums chart.

Track listing

References

2014 albums
Ringworm (band) albums
Relapse Records albums